Moon jar is a type of traditional Korean white porcelain which was made during the  Joseon dynasty (1392–1910). The Joseon white porcelain was adopted as imperial ware in the fifteenth century. The name comes from its shape and milky color of the glaze to resemble the coloration of the moon

Often it consists of two hemispherical halves that have been joined in the middle. The slightly uneven natural shape added to its appeal during the Joseon dynasty. Usually jars are made in a stable shape due to their wide bottom and smaller mouth, but moon jar has a wider mouth than the diameter of the bottom, causing instability, making it feel like the jar is floating in the air.

It has inspired many artists such as Kim Whanki and Bernard Leach.

See also
Joseon white porcelain
Buncheong
Korean pottery and porcelain

References

External links
 

Korean pottery